Ophisaurus (from the Greek 'snake-lizard') is a genus of superficially snake-like lizards in the family Anguidae. 

Known as joint snakes, glass snakes, or glass lizards, they are so-named because their tails are easily broken; like many lizards, they have the ability to deter predation by dropping off part of the tail, which can break into several pieces, like glass. The tail remains mobile, distracting the predator, while the lizard becomes motionless, allowing eventual escape. This serious loss of body mass requires a considerable effort to replace, and can take years to do so. Despite this ability, the new tail is usually smaller than the original.

Although most species have no legs, their head shapes, movable eyelids, and external ear openings identify them as lizards. A few species have very small, stub-like legs near their rear vents. These are vestigial organs, meaning they once served an evolved purpose but are no longer used. Glass lizards feed on insects, spiders, other small reptiles, and young rodents. Their diets are limited by their inability to unhinge their jaws. Some glass lizards give birth to live young but most lay eggs.

Feeding
Their diets consist primarily of arthropods, with larger animals eating snails and small mammals.

Species
The genus Ophisaurus (sensu lato) contains two monophyletic sister clades, one native to North America, the other to Asia, the latter is sometimes treated as the separate genus Dopasia.

Nota bene: In the list below,  a binomial authority in parentheses indicates that the species was originally described in a genus other than Ophisaurus.

 Ophisaurus sensu stricto: (native to North America)
Ophisaurus attenuatus  – slender glass lizard
Ophisaurus ceroni  – Ceron's glass lizard
Ophisaurus compressus  – island glass lizard
Ophisaurus incomptus  – plainneck glass lizard
Ophisaurus mimicus  – mimic glass lizard
Ophisaurus ventralis  – eastern glass lizard
 Ophisaurus/Dopasia (native to Asia)
 Ophisaurus buettikoferi  – Buettikofer's glass lizard
 Ophisaurus gracilis  – Burmese glass lizard, Asian glass lizard, Indian glass snake
 Ophisaurus hainanensis  – Hainan glass lizard
 Ophisaurus harti  – Hart's glass lizard
 Ophisaurus ludovici  – Ludovic's glass lizard
 Ophisaurus sokolovi  – Sokolov's glass lizard
 Ophisaurus wegneri  – Wegner's glass lizard

Hyalosaurus from North Africa has also been included within the concept of Ophisaurus sensu lato, but genetic evidence has shown them to be more closely related to Anguis and Pseudopus.

Fossil record 
Ophisaurus sensu lato was once widely distributed in Europe, first appearing there during the Eocene, with its distribution at its maximum extent during the Miocene, their range had contracted to the Mediterranean by the late Pliocene. The youngest records of Ophisaurus in Europe are from southern Spain, dating to the Early-Mid Pleistocene transition around 800,000 years ago. The decline was likely caused by decreasing temperatures and increasing aridity due to the onset of glaciation. Ophisaurus sensu lato likely dispersed into Asia from Europe before dispersing from Asia into North America via Beringia. The oldest records of Ophisaurus in North America are from the late Miocene.

See also
American legless lizard
Pygopodidae
Slowworm
Limbless vertebrates

References

Further reading
Boulenger GA (1885). Catalogue of the Lizards in the British Museum (Natural History). Second Edition. Volume II. ... Anguidæ ... London: Trustees of the British Museum (Natural History). (Taylor and Francis, printers). xiii + 497 pp. + Plates I-XXIV. (Genus Ophisaurus, p. 279).
Daudin FM (1803). Histoire Naturelle, Générale et Particulière des Reptiles; Ouvrage faisant suite aux Œuvres de Leclerc de Buffon, et partie du Cours complet d'Histoire naturelle rédigé par C.S. Sonnini, membre de plusieurs Sociétés savantes. Tome septième [Volume 7]. Paris: F. Dufart. 436 pp. (Ophisaurus, new genus, p. 346). (in French).
Goin CJ, Goin OB, Zug GR (1978). Introduction to Herpetology, Third Edition. San Francisco: W.H. Freeman. xi + 378 pp. . (Ophisaurus, p. 293).

External links
 Ophisaurus at Life is Short, but Snakes are Long

Ophisaurus
Lizard genera
Taxa named by François Marie Daudin